Rhys Thornbury (born 15 January 1990) is a skeleton racer from New Zealand. He competed for New Zealand at the 2018 Winter Olympics. Away from sport, he is a weapons technician for the Royal Air Force.

References 

1990 births
Living people
New Zealand male skeleton racers
Olympic skeleton racers of New Zealand
Skeleton racers at the 2018 Winter Olympics